Andrew A.C. Heggie is an oral and maxillofacial surgeon at the Royal Children's Hospital in Melbourne, Australia. His primary interest has been the management of developmental skeletal facial deformity, including patients with cleft lip and palate, craniofacial microsomia and infants with micrognathism. His contribution to the treatment of infant upper airway obstruction for Pierre Robin sequence, using internal devices for jaw lengthening using distraction osteogenesis, has replaced the need for tracheostomy in this condition. In 2019, Heggie was awarded Member of the Order of Australia for significant service to medicine and dentistry in the field of oral and maxillofacial surgery.

Education 
Completing his secondary school education at Scotch College, Melbourne in 1972, Heggie graduated from the University of Melbourne with first class honors in Dentistry in 1977. He trained in Oral and Maxillofacial Surgery at The Royal Dental Hospital of Melbourne and the Royal Melbourne Hospital and then undertook Fellowship training in Seattle at Providence Medical Centre and the University of Washington in 1982-1983. He subsequently returned to the University of Melbourne and completed a medical degree with Honors in 1991. Additional Fellowship training was undertaken in craniofacial surgery at the Royal Children’s Hospital of Melbourne in 2001.

Research and career 
In 1994, Heggie was recruited to the Department of Plastic and Maxillofacial Surgery at the Royal Children’s Hospital of Melbourne, where he was appointed Head, Section of Oral and Maxillofacial Surgery (OMS), a position held until 2018 before transitioning to Senior OMS. In collaboration with craniofacial surgeon, Anthony D. Holmes, protocols for the comprehensive management of cleft lip and palate and other anomalies were further developed and refined with respect to the treatment of their facial deformities. In developing paediatric oral and maxillofacial surgery in Australasia, a Fellowship in this sub-specialty commenced in 2007 to the present. He has contributed to the International Consortium for Health Outcomes Measurement (ICHOMS) in cleft lip and palate and craniofacial microsomia. From 2013-2015, he was president of the Australian and New Zealand Association of Oral and Maxillofacial Surgeons. The Melbourne Research Unit for Facial Disorders was established by Heggie within the University of Melbourne in 2002 following a philanthropic donation for translational research.

Awards and honors 

Distinguished Service Award in Oral & Maxillofacial Surgery: Australian Dental Association (Vic), 2008 

Paul Harris Fellowship Award - Rotary International for services to Rotary Overseas Medical Aid for Children, 2008

Distinguished Service Award: Australian and New Zealand Association of Oral and Maxillofacial Surgeons, 2011

Distinguished Service Award, Australian and New Zealand Association of Oral and Maxillofacial Surgeons,  Victorian Branch, 2015

Honorary Fellowship - Royal College of Surgeons of Edinburgh: Ad Hominem (FRCS Edin) for contribution to OMS, 2015 

Meritorious Service Award- Royal Australasian College of Dental Surgeons- for services to Oral & Maxillofacial Surgery, 2016

Member of the Order of Australia (AM) – for services to medicine and dentistry in the field of oral & maxillofacial surgery, 2019 

Professional Affiliations
 Australian and New Zealand Association of Oral and Maxillofacial Surgeons
 International Association of Oral and Maxillofacial Surgeons
 International Society of Craniofacial Surgeons 
 Australian & NZ Society of Craniomaxillofacial Surgeons 
 Australian Medical Association
 Australian Dental Association

Publications

 Treatment outcomes for adolescent ectodermal dysplasia patients treated with dental implants.
 Use of a resorbable fixation system in orthognathic surgery.
 Juvenile mandibular chronic osteomyelitis: a distinct clinical entity.
 Tongue reduction for macroglossia in Beckwith Wiedemann syndrome: review and application of new technique.  
 The role of distraction osteogenesis in the management of craniofacial syndromes.

References

External links 
 Google Scholar - Andrew Heggie 
 PubMed - 
 ResearchGate - 

Living people
University of Melbourne alumni
Australian maxillofacial surgeons
University of Washington people
Year of birth missing (living people)
Place of birth missing (living people)